The 2006 Markham municipal election was held in Markham, Ontario on November 13, 2006. The election was held as required by law for municipalities in the Province of Ontario. Markham has a dual-tier government system where constituents elect ward councillors to town council and regional councillors to regional council and a mayor elected to both town council and regional council.

Election
The election was held to elect a mayor, 4 regional councillors, 8 ward councillors and 8 school board trustees. The election was held in conjugation with other municipal elections across Ontario on this date.

There were 4 candidates running for mayor, 9 candidates running for regional council, 41 candidates running for ward council and 19 candidates running for various school boards. The election saw a turnout of 58,409 constituents out of the total 261,573 constituents living Markham, thus, a 22.33% turnout rate.

Results

Mayor

Notes: Orrico was charged with threatening Scarpitti by York Regional Police in relation with this election.

Regional Council

Notes: 4 councillors and the mayor, representing Markham, were elected into regional council.

Ward 1

Ward 2

Ward 3

Ward 4

Ward 5

Ward 6

Ward 7

Ward 8

York Catholic District School Board

Wards 1, 2, 3 and 6

Wards 4, 5, 7 and 8

York Region District School Board

Wards 1 and 2

Wards 3 and 6

Wards 4 and 5

Wards 7 and 8

Conseil Scolaire De District Du Centre-Sud-Ouest

Conseil Scolaire De District Catholique Centre-Sud

See also
 2010 Markham municipal election

References

External links
 Town of Markham - Home

2006 Ontario municipal elections
2006